The South African Railways Class 15E 4-8-2 of 1935 was a steam locomotive.

Between 1935 and 1937, the South African Railways placed forty-four Class 15E steam locomotives with a 4-8-2 Mountain type wheel arrangement in service.

Manufacturers
The Class 15E 4-8-2 Mountain type mixed traffic steam locomotive was a refinement of the Classes 15C and 15CA. It was designed by A.G. Watson, Chief Mechanical Engineer (CME) of the South African Railways (SAR) from 1929 to 1936, and incorporated many of the improvements which had been developed by him, some of which were a vastly enlarged standardised boiler, a large and wide fire grate and a Watson cab.

They were built by three manufacturers. In 1935, British locomotive builders Robert Stephenson and Hawthorns (RSH) delivered twenty locomotives, numbered in the range from 2858 to 2877. Henschel and Son of Kassel in Germany built and delivered sixteen in two batches in 1936, numbered in the range from 2878 to 2893. Also in 1936, German locomotive builders Berliner Maschinenbau built another eight locomotives which were delivered in 1937, numbered in the range from 2894 to 2901. The British-built locomotives were  heavier than the German-built ones.

Characteristics
The Class 15D classification was never used by the Railways, possibly to have this locomotive's class letter match that of the Class 16E which was delivered in the same year.

Because of the free running that was achieved with the Classes 15E, 16E and 19C which all entered service in 1935 and were all equipped with rotary cam poppet valve gear, Watson decided to adopt this type of valve gear for all his future designs. Most valve gear components of the Class 15E were interchangeable with similar parts of the Class 16E. Like the other classes with poppet valve gear, the Class 15E was fast, but some trouble was initially experienced with the valve gear in the reverse position. This was corrected by modifying the reversing cams and these, as well as new forward cams, were manufactured at the Salt River shops in Cape Town.

The Class 15E, nicknamed Bongol, was delivered with a Watson Standard no. 3B boiler and a Watson cab. In the 1930s, Watson designed a standard boiler type and a cab with an inclined front as part of his standardisation policy. New locomotives which were acquired in the Watson era and later, such as the Class 15E, were built with such boilers and cabs.

The locomotives were initially equipped with two large inclined Ross-pop safety valves, mounted on the upper sides of the boiler just ahead of the firebox and aimed about 80 degrees apart. When these inclined valves blew off under a station canopy, bystanders often received a shower of slimy wet soot. After the war, they were replaced by smaller Ross-pop valves at the highest point of the boiler that blew off straight up.

Some of the locomotives that worked on sections with tunnels were equipped with smoke deflecting cowls around their chimneys.

The  bore by  stroke cylinders were interchangeable with those of the Class 16E. The cylinders had cast-iron liners and the steam and exhaust valve seatings were renewable. The connecting and coupling rods were fitted with floating bronze bushes and all crank pins were hollow bored. Soft grease lubrication was used for the motion, while the coupled wheel axle boxes were hard grease lubricated.

The buffing gear between engine and tender consisted of a laminated spring, contained in a steel casting attached to the tender's front buffer beam. The tender was the Type JT which was first introduced in 1935 along with the Class 15E Mountain type and Class 16E Pacific type.

Service

South African Railways

The Class 15E was placed in service on the mainline between Cape Town and Beaufort West. Later, when the Classes 15F and 23 were placed in service, the Class 15E locomotives were relocated further north to work between Beaufort West and De Aar. During 1954–1955, upon the arrival of the Class 25 condensers and Class 25NC, they were displaced from the Cape mainline and all 44 Bongols were relocated, this time to Bloemfontein.

In the 1960s they went to Bethlehem in the Orange Free State, from where they worked to Harrismith, Bloemfontein and Kroonstad. They were all withdrawn from regular service in 1973, except no. 2878 which was retained in running order for excursion trains.

Other operators
Eleven of the Class 15E locomotives were eventually sold to neighbouring countries or into industrial service. Six of them were sold to Rhodesia Railways (RR) in 1970, where they retained their 15E classification but were renumbered by omitting the first digit of their SAR numbers. In Rhodesia they were stationed only at Bulawayo, and used virtually exclusively on trains to and from Gwelo. The Rhodesian locomotives did not last long in RR service, however, and were scrapped in 1973.

Three locomotives were sold to Caminhos de Ferro de Mocambique (CFM) in 1972, where they were renumbered 721, 722 and 723 respectively.

Two locomotives were sold to Dunn's Locomotive Works, to be employed at Durban Navigation Collieries (Durnacol) at Dannhauser in Natal.

The table shows the Class 15E engine numbers, builders, years built, works numbers and post-SAR owners.

Preservation

Illustration
The main picture shows preserved Henschel-built no. 2878 with elephant ear smoke deflectors at Magaliesburg, Transvaal, on 26 July 1992, while the following pictures illustrate some differences in appearance over the years.

References

1860
1860
1860
4-8-2 locomotives
2D1 locomotives
Robert Stephenson and Hawthorns locomotives
Henschel locomotives
Berliner locomotives
Cape gauge railway locomotives
Steam locomotives of Zimbabwe
Railway locomotives introduced in 1935
1935 in South Africa